Greatest Hits is the first greatest hits album by American country music band Highway 101. This compilation of their previous hits also included two new songs: "Someone Else's Trouble Now" and "The Change." The rest of the album was filled with four songs from Highway 101, and two songs each from Highway 101² and Paint the Town.

Track listing

Chart performance

Album

Singles

References

Highway 101 albums
Albums produced by Paul Worley
1990 greatest hits albums
Warner Records compilation albums